The Yamaha SDR200 is a 200 cc single-cylinder two-stroke motorcycle. It was manufactured and sold from around 1986 to 1987. Although it was intended for the Japanese home market only, a few examples have escaped as grey imports.

Its distinguishing characteristics are its diminutive size and a chrome trellis frame similar to that of a Ducati Monster.

External links

Official websites
Yamaha Motors Co. ltd - YMC- Japan (Global)

Related links
SDR200 Information

SDR200
Two-stroke motorcycles